Carol Ann Peters Duncan (June 16, 1932 – May 16, 2022) was an American figure skater who competed in ice dancing. Her skating partner was Daniel Ryan.

She had 19 grandchildren.

Results
(with Daniel Ryan)

References

Sources

Navigation

1932 births
2022 deaths
American female ice dancers
World Figure Skating Championships medalists
21st-century American women
Sportspeople from Buffalo, New York